Denys Anatoliyovych Onyshchenko (born 15 September 1978) is a former Ukrainian football player. He played for Hapoel Tel Aviv FC in the Israeli Premier League and for FC Dynamo Kyiv. Onyshchenko also has three international caps for Ukraine.

Honours
Dynamo Kyiv
Ukrainian Premier League champion: 1998–99, 2003–04

Hapoel Tel Aviv
Israeli Premier League champion: 1999–2000
Israeli Premier League runner-up: 2000–01, 2001–02
Israeli Premier League bronze: 2002–03
Israel State Cup winner: 1999–2000

External links

References

1978 births
Sportspeople from Poltava
Living people
Ukrainian footballers
FC Dnipro players
FC Metalurh Novomoskovsk players
FC Dynamo-2 Kyiv players
FC Dynamo-3 Kyiv players
FC Dynamo Kyiv players
Ukrainian Premier League players
FC Dnipro-2 Dnipropetrovsk players
Hapoel Tel Aviv F.C. players
Ukrainian expatriate footballers
Expatriate footballers in Israel
Ukraine international footballers
FC Vorskla Poltava players
FC Tom Tomsk players
Russian Premier League players
Expatriate footballers in Russia
FC Zorya Luhansk players
FC Mariupol players

Association football midfielders